Toveh Sorkhak-e Nesar (also Romanized as Toveh Sorkhak-e Nesār; also known as Tovahsorkhak-e ‘Olyā-e Nesār) is a village in Homeyl Rural District, Homeyl District, Eslamabad-e Gharb County, Kermanshah Province, Iran. At the 2006 census, its population was 152, in 35 families.

References 

Populated places in Eslamabad-e Gharb County